Two cities submitted bids to host the 1975 Pan American Games that were recognized by the Pan American Sports Organization. On August 29, 1969, Santiago was selected unanimously over San Juan to host the VII Pan American Games by PASO at its 10th general assembly, held in Cali, Colombia.

In 1973, Santiago dropped out from hosting, and in 1974, its replacement Sao Paulo did the same. Mexico City was granted the hosting rights with just 10 months to prepare.

Host city selection 
Twenty-seven countries took part in the vote.

Candidate cities

Santiago, Chile 

This bid marked the fourth time that Santiago had bid to host the Pan American Games—first in Sao Paulo, then in Mexico, and most recently, in Winnipeg.

San Juan, Puerto Rico 
It was generally understood that San Juan would not host the 1975 Pan American Games; as such, President of the Puerto Rico Olympic Committee Felicio Terregrosa asked to be the alternate host city, should Santiago back out. Puerto Rico's bid was presented extemporaneously.

Mexico City hosts the games 
In 1973, due to unstable political and financial reasons mainly due to the military coup of Augusto Pinochet, Santiago declined to organize the games. The runner-up San Juan had already been awarded the 1979 Pan American Games, so they declined to host the games. Sao Paulo took over as the host city but was forced to relinquish them as well due to economic reasons and an outbreak of meningitis in 1974.

After Sao Paulo dropped out, President Luis Echeverría Álvarez informed President of the Mexican Olympic Committee (COM) Mario Vázquez Raña that Mexico City was authorized to bid as host for the games. The committee then informed PASO that the city would host the games, so long as no other countries are interested. With just 10 months until the Pan American Games, the PASO announced that Mexico City would serve as the host city.

References

1975 Pan American Games
Bids for the Pan American Games